Leinier Domínguez Pérez (born September 23, 1983) is a Cuban and American chess grandmaster. A five-time Cuban champion, Domínguez was the world champion in blitz chess in 2008. He competed in the FIDE World Chess Championship in 2002 and 2004, and the FIDE World Cup in 2007, 2009, 2011, 2013 and 2015.

Career
Domínguez won the Carlos Torre Repetto Memorial in Mérida, Yucatán, Mexico in 2001. He won the Cuban Chess Championship in 2002, 2003, 2006, 2012 and 2016. Also in 2002, he shared first place with Lázaro Bruzón in the North Sea Cup in Esbjerg, Denmark.

During the FIDE World Chess Championship 2004 he reached the quarterfinals, losing to Teimour Radjabov in the tie-break. In the same year, Domínguez Pérez won the Capablanca Memorial for the first time. He won this tournament also in 2008 and 2009.

In 2006, Domínguez won the Magistral Ciutat de Barcelona tournament in Barcelona scoring 8/9 points, ahead of Vasyl Ivanchuk, with a performance rating of 2932.
In 2008, he won the "CPA" chess tournament  and the 43rd Capablanca Memorial tournament. In the same year, he tied for first with Evgeny Alekseev at the Biel Chess Festival, ahead of Magnus Carlsen. Domínguez Pérez finished second after losing the playoff. On November 8, 2008 Domínguez Pérez won the World Blitz Championship, held at Almaty in Kazakhstan, scoring 11½ points out of 15, ahead of Vassily Ivanchuk, Peter Svidler, Alexander Grischuk and many other top grandmasters.

In June 2013 he won the FIDE Grand Prix event in Thessaloniki as a clear first in a field of twelve elite players, among them Fabiano Caruana, Veselin Topalov and Alexander Grischuk. In 2016, Domínguez Pérez shared 2nd−4th places at the Dortmund Sparkassen Chess Meeting with Vladimir Kramnik and Fabiano Caruana. Later in the same year, he won the individual silver medal playing board one for the Cuban team in the 42nd Chess Olympiad in Baku.

He was a second for Fabiano Caruana in the 2018 World Chess Championship

In December 2018, Domínguez Pérez transferred federations to represent the United States.

Through February and March 2022, Domínguez played in the FIDE Grand Prix 2022. In the first leg, he won his pool with a 4/6 result by also defeating Wesley So in rapid tiebreakers. In the third leg, he finished third in Pool B with a result of 3/6, finishing eighth in the standings with nine points.

In April 2022 he participated in the American Cup. He won the 2nd place in the 2019 U.S. Chess Championship and 3rd place in the 2022 U.S. Chess Championship.

Notable games
 Magnus Carlsen vs Leinier Dominguez-Perez, Biel 2008, Sicilian Defense: Najdorf Variation, Adams Attack (B90), ½–½
 Alexander Onischuk vs Leinier Dominguez-Perez, Biel, 2008, Gruenfeld Defense: Russian, Hungarian Variation (D97), 0-1
 Evgeny Alekseev vs Leinier Dominguez-Perez, Biel 2008, Sicilian Defense: Najdorf, Zagreb Variation (B91), 0-1
 Leinier Dominguez-Perez vs Alexander Morozevich, Corus 2009, Sicilian Defense: Najdorf Variation, English Attack (B90), 1-0

References

External links
 
 
 
 
 
 
 
 

1983 births
Living people
People from Havana
Chess grandmasters
Chess Olympiad competitors
Cuban chess players
American chess players
Cuban emigrants to the United States